Rokas Stanulevičius (born 2 October 1994, in Lithuania) is a Lithuanian professional footballer who played for FC Džiugas Telšiai as a midfielder.

Career
He started to play football in his native town Biržai and later removed to Panevėžys. 
 
He spent a few seasons at FK Ekranas. Played in FK Riteriai and was sold to Israel.

Return back to Lithuania and was a member of Džiugas Club.

In January 2022 he signed with FK Panevėžys.

References

1994 births
Living people
Lithuanian footballers
FK Ekranas players
FK Riteriai players
Hapoel Ironi Kiryat Shmona F.C. players
Hapoel Nof HaGalil F.C. players
FK Panevėžys players
A Lyga players
Israeli Premier League players
Liga Leumit players
People from Biržai
Expatriate footballers in Israel
Lithuanian expatriate sportspeople in Israel
Association football midfielders